Actinodendridae is a family of cnidarians belonging to the order Actiniaria.

Genera:
 Actinodendron Quoy & Gaimard, 1830
 Actinodendron de Blainville, 1830
 Actinostephanus Kwietniewski, 1897
 Megalactis Hemprich & Ehrenberg, 1834

References

 
Actinioidea
Cnidarian families